Tiberius Sempronius Longus may refer to:
Tiberius Sempronius Longus (consul 218 BC), who fought Hannibal's forces in the Second Punic War
Tiberius Sempronius Longus (consul 194 BC), who defended Roman settlements from the Gauls